Creation is the fifth and latest studio album by The Pierces, released by Polydor on September 1, 2014. It reached No. 7 on the UK Albums Chart.

Singles
"Kings" was the first single released from the album, it was released on January 31, 2014. It reached number 191 in the UK, on 31 May.
"Believe in Me" was the second single released from the album, it was released on March 31, 2014 and peaked at number 66 on the UK Singles Chart.
The video for the next single "Creation" was premiered on August 8, 2014 and was directed by Nick Frew.
The fourth and final single from the album was "The Devil Is a Lonely Night," released November 5, 2014.

Track listing

Personnel
Allison Pierce – lead & backing vocals, acoustic guitar, songwriting
Catherine Pierce – lead & backing vocals, songwriting

References

2014 albums
The Pierces albums
Polydor Records albums